Tom Fleming (born February 1951) is an Irish former Independent politician who served as a Teachta Dála (TD) for the Kerry South constituency from 2011 to 2016.

Fleming is a former Fianna Fáil member of Kerry County Council, and was co-opted to the council before the 1985 local elections, as a Fianna Fáil Councillor for the Killarney local electoral area, following the death of his father. He retained his seat at the 1999, 2004 and 2009 local elections. He was an unsuccessful Fianna Fáil candidate for Kerry South at the 2002 and 2007 general elections.

He and fellow councillor Michael Cahill left Fianna Fáil on 12 January 2011. He contested the Kerry South constituency at the 2011 general election as an independent candidate, winning a seat. He was part of the Dáil Technical group which gives independents and minor parties more speaking time in Dáil debates.

Fleming was the fourth generation of his family to serve on Kerry County Council.

He was a member of the Independent Alliance. On 5 February 2016, he announced that he would not be contesting the 2016 general election on 26 February.

References

 

1951 births
Living people
Fianna Fáil politicians
Independent TDs
Local councillors in County Kerry
Members of the 31st Dáil
Politicians from County Kerry